Cleora samoana, the forest looper caterpillar, is a moth of the  family Geometridae. It is found on Fiji, Niue, Samoa and Tonga.

The larvae feed on the leaves of Citrus species.

Subspecies
Cleora samoana samoana
Cleora samoana fijiensis Robinson, 1975
Cleora samoana noatau Robinson, 1975

References

Moths described in 1886
Cleora
Moths of Oceania